Kari Stai (born 1974) is a Norwegian illustrator, graphic designer and children's writer. In 2012, she was awarded the Brage Prize for children's literature with her Jakob og Neikob. Tjuven slår tilbake.

References

External links
Kari Stai's website

1974 births
Living people
Norwegian illustrators
Norwegian graphic designers
Norwegian women artists
Norwegian children's writers
Norwegian women children's writers
Norwegian women illustrators
Norwegian children's book illustrators
People from Trondheim
21st-century Norwegian writers
21st-century Norwegian women writers
Women graphic designers